Eide og Omegn FK is a Norwegian association football club from Hustadvika, Møre og Romsdal.

The club was founded in 1992, as a merge between Eide IL, Lyngstad IL  and Frode IL.

The men's football team currently resides in the Norwegian Fourth Division (Tier 5). Its last stint in the Third Division came from 2003 to 2006.

References

External links
Official site

Football clubs in Norway
Association football clubs established in 1992
1992 establishments in Norway
Sport in Møre og Romsdal
Hustadvika (municipality)